Ryan Fisher (born 5 April 1991) is an Australian triathlete. He competed in the men's event at the 2016 Summer Olympics. He was selected for the 2016 team over Jacob Birtwhistle. In 2017, he competed in the first episode of Australian Ninja Warrior.

References

External links
 

1991 births
Living people
Australian male triathletes
Olympic triathletes of Australia
Triathletes at the 2016 Summer Olympics
Place of birth missing (living people)
20th-century Australian people
21st-century Australian people